There are several places in Kentucky named Trinity.  One is an unincorporated community located in Lawrence County, Kentucky, United States that no longer exists. Another is a populated place located in Lewis County which still exists.

References

Unincorporated communities in Lawrence County, Kentucky
Unincorporated communities in Kentucky